Mikhail Ivanovich Rodionov (– 1 October 1950) was a Soviet-Russian statesman who, from 1946 to 1949, was the Chairman of the Council of Ministers of the Russian SFSR. He was purged during the Leningrad affair.

He created a proposal for a new state flag of the RSFSR, but it was rejected. It consisted of a traditional Russian tricolour flag at and a hammer and sickle in the middle. Together with Nikolai Voznesensky, he was sentenced to death in 1950 based on false accusations of embezzlement from the Soviet State budget for "unapproved business in Leningrad", which was labeled anti-Soviet treason, at the Leningrad Affair case.
He was a close companion of Alexei Kosygin.

References 

1907 births
1950 deaths
Central Committee of the Communist Party of the Soviet Union members
Politburo of the Central Committee of the Communist Party of the Soviet Union members
Russian communists
Heads of government of the Russian Soviet Federative Socialist Republic
People executed for treason against the Soviet Union
Members of the Communist Party of the Soviet Union executed by the Soviet Union
Russian people executed by the Soviet Union
Executed people from Nizhny Novgorod Oblast
NKVD
Political repression in the Soviet Union
People executed for corruption
First Secretaries of the Gorky Regional Committee of the CPSU